Roxanne Fontana (born Roseann Fontana 2 September 1959) is a dual-national Italian American author, singer, songwriter, musician, recording artist, poet, actress, and clothing and jewelry designer.

Early life 
Fontana was born in Brooklyn, New York, in the United States. Her parents were working class Italian-Americans from Brooklyn's Bedford Stuyvesant slums. Fontana spent her childhood in the 1960s a few blocks from the childhood home of writer Arthur Miller, in the predominantly Italian and Jewish neighbourhood of the part of Brooklyn bordering Midwood and Bensonhurst.  It was here in 1968 that she developed an interest in fashion design after a child modelling try-out in a Lexington Avenue agency in New York City.  Fontana developed her songwriting, guitar playing, singing and journal writing, living in Elmont, Long Island, US, during the 1970s.   An avid music fanatic, Fontana ran an international fan club for Rolling Stone Brian Jones, which was officially recognized by the Rolling Stones, in the mid- to late 1970s.

Music 
Fontana has over 80 compositions registered with the United States Copyright Office, authoring both lyrics and music.

Fontana began her music career at New York City nightclubs during the 1980s. This included multiple performances at CBGB, The Bitter End, and Webster Hall, among many others. Fontana's bands The Blue Way, Kid Blue, and Ruzenka and the Big Dream, were male rock groups that Fontana dominated by writing all of the material, and fronting. She also performed under her name Roseann Fontana for a number of shows, from acoustic shows to fronting bands as a solo artist. Fontana recorded unreleased material until her first release in 1999. The unreleased material included a popular Fontana song called, “Lifetrap” which was mixed by Ivan Kral during Iggy Pop recording Sessions for the album Party. Kral also added synthesizer and keyboards to the track.  The song was re-recorded in London in 2019.

In the early 1980s Fontana relocated to Los Angeles, which she has made her home at various times in her life since.  Roxanne played the club circuit of Los Angeles in the early 1980s. In the mid-1980s Fontana travelled on her own to Europe and lived two summers in the Netherlands, recording with a local rock band in Arnhem on the border of northern Germany. Fontana returned home seeking to release the recorded music, which went unreleased for decades.

Fontana took up residence again in New York and shortly thereafter appeared on the cover of the East Village’s local newspaper Downtown where she was labelled, “The Hippest Lady In New York”.  Fontana soon after left for Los Angeles again before returning to New York in the mid-1990s to form the psychedelic group Ruzenka and the Big Dream with drummer Rich Teeter from New York punk rock group the Dictators. That group lasted several years, playing residencies at the Bitter End, and recording at Electric Lady Studios. In 1993, Andy Warhol assistant, poet, and photographer Gerard Malanga wrote of Fontana during that time.  He predicted Fontana as “the voice reaching the millennium.”  Rock writer and musician Lenny Kaye referred to her music as "shimmering nighttime pop."

Fontana was known as Ruzenka after her band from the mid-1990s. Upon its disbanding she legally changed her name to Roxanne Fontana. Fontana  states this was the name her mother wanted to name her in 1959. Roxanne did the college circuit of the New York City area fronting a country rock band and drawing from her songwriting catalogue for her country-influenced songs.

In the spring of 1999 in New York City, Fontana hooked up with legendary drummer Dino Danelli of the hit 1960s rock group The Rascals, after specifically seeking him out to play drums on one of her songs. Danelli wanted to produce Fontana for a full album, and did so at Bomb Shelter Studios in New York City. His electronic dance ideas were imposed upon the folk-rock Fontana. Fontana would record her songs in the studio and come back days later to do vocals to backing tracks created by Danelli and guitarist and engineer Eddie Fritz. Atlantic Records rejected the album, which included musical contributions from Marty Willson-Piper from the Australian rock band the Church, and Benjy King, formerly of the new wave group Scandal. Fontana decided to start her own label in New York City and, against Danelli's wishes, released the record.  AllMusic called the record "Mysterious and inviting stuff."

The next year Fontana followed up with a folk-rock CD which was more in line with her preferred style of music, the orchestrated folk-rock of the mid-1960s. Gordon Raphael, producer of the Strokes, recorded the album for her at his Transporterraum Studios in New York City's East Village and played on every track on the record. The album also once again featured Marty Willson-Piper. Critic Joe Viglione said of the album, "Fontana does a fine job producing herself, and the record is a departure from the sound forged on the debut disc."

A review by Joseph Tortelli of Goldmine Magazine revealed Fontana to possess an "innocent-yet-world-weary voice." Contrasting the two releases' styles, Tortelli stated, "Title these CDs 'a tale of two pop sounds': one electronic and percussive; the other haunting folk-rock."

Fontana put her music career on hold in 2001 when she married and moved to Los Angeles with Montreal guitarist singer 20 years her junior, Mat Treiber.  She co-wrote many songs that Treiber would perform in Los Angeles night clubs including “Je Ne Peus Pas Voler,” “Go All Around the World,” She's Got It Good,” and many more.  Fontana managed husband Treiber at the beginning of their marriage.

The couple moved to England to be near Treiber’s chosen musicians and band. They have lived there since 2006. Since that time Fontana has released some recordings from her unreleased catalogue starting with a song entitled “Green,” recorded with her band Ruzenka and the Big Dream  at Electric Ladyland Studios in New York City in the mid-1990s. She also released a number of tracks recorded in the Netherlands entitled, The Best of the 80s. She continues to record sporadically:  “Another Place”, a song by Françoise Hardy; “The Fields of St. Etienne”, a song by Gallagher and Lyle. In 2013 in Brighton, England, Fontana recorded originals “New Moon Child” and “Passing Bye”, produced by Russell C. Brennan.  Fontana and husband Mat Treiber enjoy making Scopitone-style videos to Fontana's released material. In 2016, Fontana chose the location of her childhood neighborhood in Brooklyn, NY, as the setting for her promotional video for the release 'He Does the Look'. Other locations have included the Côte d'Azur ('Eyes of the Defeated', 'Sans Issue', 'Deep Sea', 'La Mer'), Italy ('Roman's Holiday'), and various locations around England, including the gardens around different residences ('Passing Bye', 'Michael In the Garden'). Fontana's record sales and the interest in her music have grown year after year into an international cult status in the truest indie-artist manner. Fontana has played occasional acoustic shows in New York City, Prague and London in the 2010s.

In August 2015 Fontana went into the studio in New York with producer Jack Douglas to record the song “Time Won’t Wait”. Speaking with DJ Steve Dima (formerly DJ Pledge of East Village Radio) on Little Water Radio in New York the following week, Fontana stated that she had written the song the night of 8 December 1980, shortly before the death of John Lennon. It had always been her goal to record the song with Douglas, Lennon's producer, who had been working with Lennon on his final recordings, including on the night he was assassinated. The song will be released worldwide on 8 December 2015, the 35th Anniversary of both the song's conception and Lennon's murder.

On 30 March 2018, Fontana's recorded cover version of the Jagger/Richards song 'So Much In Love' was released as a digital download. The song was recorded in London, and produced by Tony Oliver from the 1970s blues-rock group The Inmates. Tony Oliver played all the guitars and bass on the recording himself.

2018 was the busiest year for Fontana's download single releases.  It was a year of tributes, as Fontana concentrated on cover songs.  After the release of 'So Much In Love', 'Love For Sale' by The Fore was the next release.  As a friend of the band, Fontana convinced them to give her the backing tracks to their version of this single.  In London the tracks were laid open for Fontana to place her lead vocal.  The video for the single was shot on the streets of Shepherd's Bush, London.  Fontana appears to be in the role of a prostitute.  Fontana next covered the Bonnie Bramlett/Leon Russell 'Groupie Superstar', and dedicated it to Tom Petty.  The video was shot in the front garden of Fontana's home in England, and invoked a supernatural energy.  Fontana's final recording of 2018 was released in early 2019, 'You Can't Put Your Arms Around a Memory', by fellow New York City writer-musician Johnny Thunders.  Adorned in items depicting her past, including necklaces gifted to her by Ivan Kral and associates of the Rolling Stones, Fontana is seen in old haunts around New York for the accompanying video.  During this era, Fontana did numerous interviews with indie magazines and radio stations.  She spoke on several subjects, including leaving the USA, being an indie artist, Tom Petty, and living in England.

In 2019, Fontana returned to the airwaves.  Radio Caroline, Stony Brook University's WUSB (FM), as well as various Internet radio stations worldwide, continued to play Roxanne Fontana download singles, which were made available from iTunes and other popular download houses.  Fontana recorded (in London) and released a new version 'Lifetrap', and for the first time made the song available to the public.  As usual, an accompanying video was made.  The video for 'Lifetrap' was shot on location around Prague in the summer of 2019.  2020 sees the release of two versions of the Fontana original 'Just One Time': the first, translated into French, entitled 'Une Seule Fois', in the summer, followed by the English version later in the year.  The versions were recorded over several recording sessions in East London and the West Midlands.

In 2022, Fontana folded her indie label, Etoile Records, and launched a new label, Sprezzatura Records. All the previous Etoile releases were re-released on Sprezzatura in January 2022, followed by an album compiling recently recorded singles.  The compilation was well-received.  Shindig! Magazine wrote, “… an effortless swagger and command of her art.”

In April 2022 the album Phantasmagorgy was released.  It was recorded in London, with additional musicians contributing from worldwide, including Richard Ploog, who contributed the drums for the song 'Dropping Names' in Australia. Its first single, a cover of "Hampstead Incident" written by 1960s legend Donovan, received worldwide airplay.  More than half of the album's tracks continue to receive worldwide airplay, and the album is well-received. Louder Than War picked the album as the Number 2 Pick of their June 2022 reviews of new releases, while contributor Ian Corbridge wrote "Phantasmagorgy is no ordinary album but then again Roxanne Fontana is no ordinary artist. It feels very much like the outpouring of a wild and free creative force channelling all of her inner self into a collection of folk-rock inspired songs which have 1960’s psychedelic leanings, a strong poetic vibe and a unique blend of both simplicity and complexity in equal measures. As a concept album, I found it to be a compelling listen which I have found myself returning to over and over again.” Fontana explained to International Times:

Discography

Albums 
Love Is Blue, Etoile Records 1999, produced by Dino Danelli.
Souvenirs D’Amour, Etoile Records 2001, produced by Roxanne Fontana, recorded by Gordon Raphael.
The Singles: 2010-2020, Sprezzatura Records 2022, produced by Roxanne Fontana, Russell Brennan, Tony Oliver, Jack Douglas.
Phantasmagorgy, Sprezzatura Records 2022, produced by Roxanne Fontana.
Track listing: 
 Announcement (Fontana)
The Peak (Fontana)
(Eat the) Morning Glory (Fontana)
Home Sweet Home (Fontana)
Into the Deep (Mills/Bevan)
Barbara Jones (Marion)
Dropping Names (Kilbey)
Hampstead Incident (Leitch)

EPs 
The Best of the 80s, recorded in Arnhem, the Netherlands.

Singles 
“Fields of St. Etienne” 2009
“Green” 2009
“Another Place” 2010
“New Moon Child” 2013
“Passing Bye” 2014
"Time Won't Wait" 2015
"He Does The Look" 2016
"So Much In Love" 2018
"Love For Sale" (with The Fore) 2018
"Groupie Superstar" 2018
"You Can't Put Your Arms Around A Memory" 2019
"Lifetrap" 2019
"Une Seule Fois" 2020
"Just One Time" 2020

Film 
Shorts all 1976-1978, directed by Joe Marzano, of Venus in Furs notoriety:
“Fur”
“The Leather Girls”
“Leprosy”
“Recta-Soft”
"Roxanne" video for the song by The Police
Associate producer and appears in Rolling Stone: Life and Death of Brian Jones by Danny Garcia from Chip Baker Films, 2019

Published work 
American Girl is the memoir penned by Roxanne Fontana about her life up to and including the recording of her Love Is Blue album. The book specifically ends when she meets her husband Mat Treiber, and includes the story of Fontana's fascinating life as a single woman getting discovered in the music business, her spiritual journeys, childhood street fights, and many travels and love affairs. Fontana also chronicled her lifestyle as a marijuana dealer to support her artistic ventures in the 1990s. Fontana  is planning “Part Deux” in the future to share her adventures since the ending of the last book. American Girl has been met with rave reviews in its ebook form since its release in 2012 and is planning a re-release in print new edit for 2015. Reviewer Keri English remarked about the book, "I found myself unable to stop reading at points [...] Even as she discovers horrible things about the men she chooses to let in her life, she overcomes a great deal. In matters of faith, life and love, hope is never quite lost."  The book also includes a detailed description of her one night stand in a Long Island hotel with rocker Tom Petty in 1978.  Her introduction of Tom Petty winning over a night club crowd in New York City in 1977, through to meeting him, and her subsequent resentment is a story in itself.

“America – Whore of Babylon –Mars Mars Mars” is a poem written by Fontana in Italy, immediately after becoming an ex-pat of the US in 2006.  It was published in the poetry compilation, Ava Gardner – Touches of Venus in 2007, alongside pieces by Margaret Atwood and Robert Graves, after the editor discovered her poem on her website. Critic James Srodes said of the book, "To read through this book is to realize that more than the saccharine lyrics sung to Marilyn, Ava was both a frame of reference and an inspiration for young women and young men both in their lives and in their muse. How she would have laughed."

In June 2017, Fontana wrote the essay "My Obsession, A-ni-TA". The long essay was an homage to the European muse to the Rolling Stones, model and actress Anita Pallenberg. The essay was published in the popular-cultural on-line magazine Zani, and was one of the magazine's most-read articles.

United Kingdom-based cultural online magazine Eyeplug published an excerpt of Chapter 4 of Fontana's memoir American Girl in August 2017.

In September 2017, popular British online cultural magazine Zani published an article written by Fontana about her song "He Does the Look". The article reveals Fontana's feeling about the 2016 US Presidential election, and why she chose to record her least socio-political song in that year.

In April 2021, the online pop culture magazine Please Kill Me published an article in which Fontana contrasts the lives and music of Johnny Thunders and Tom Petty.

Fontana's poem "Dear World" was published in Love Love Magazine in June 2021.  Love Love is a print magazine of modern culture distributed out of Paris by Swedish artist Lisa Marie Järlborn.  Gerard Malanga is credited as the "Inspirational Mentor" of the publication.

In October 2021, Fontana wrote a favorable review of Jennifer Otter Bickerdike's biography of Nico You Are Beautiful And You Are Alone for the online cultural magazine International Times.

Fashion 
During Fontana's pregnancy in Los Angeles she started her own jewellery design company “Chanson de Tangier,” which consisted solely of men's and women's beaded chokers. The designs were influenced by the style of her favourite fashion icon and musician, Brian Jones. The pieces were constructed of antique and vintage beads. Fontana would combine trade beads from Italy from the 1700s with sterling and African beads, some over 1,000 years old. The pieces were sold at top Los Angeles boutiques, including Lorenzo's on Sunset Plaza Drive, the trendy Kitson on Robertson Boulevard, and many more shops from West Hollywood to Venice. Before her expat status she began creating art nouveau influenced pendants using black Czech Glass and Miriam Haskell beads from the 1920s.

In the summer of 2013 Fontana opened up her boutique Atelier VivaFontana1959, which featured her art: her CDs, jewelry and clothing.  The tiny shop up an alley way in the ancient market town of Ledbury, England, featured Fontana's original and labelled designs, which consisted mainly of lingerie-weight summer tops designed of French fabrics bought on shopping trips to Paris, and Italian mesh fabrics. Fontana acquired colourful printed fabric of Florentine designers Save the Queen, which she used for her own designs. Other clothing designed and hand-made by Fontana and featured in the shop were crushed velvet hot pants, baby-doll dresses, and her signature “Little Queenie” velvet hat, shaped like a baker's beret, lined in satin, with couture grosgrain, some feathered, some featuring antique glass buttons.

Personal life 
Fontana's music and poetry has often been a public reflection of a deeply personal spiritual journey. A Christian mystic, the Roman-Catholic-born Fontana has studied the esoteric sciences and abandoned 11 years of Occultism in 1991, while living in the New York City apartment of a recently deceased Rosicrucian. 'Remedy of Days,' a single from the Souvenirs d'Amour album, reflects the importance of spirituality in her life, as does her composition 'All That Isn't Seen: The Ballad of Jan Hus.' A keen astrologer and practitioner of the natural healing arts, Fontana states that her relationship with the cosmos and God is her first and foremost relationship from which everything about her, her art, her love life, her relationship with the human race, extends.

In January 2001, at age 41, Fontana married 21-year-old Montreal-born guitarist singer-songwriter Mat Treiber, at the Neighborhood Church on Bleecker Street in New York City's Greenwich Village. Roxanne gave birth to a daughter at Cedars Sinai Hospital in Beverly Hills, California, on December 24, 2002. The family left the US for Italy in 2006, and have made their home in England for many years.

References

 Roxanne Fontana, American Girl (Bookbaby, 2012)
 Gilbert L. Gigliotti, Ed. (2010). Ava Gardner: Touches of Venus, p. 114. Entasis Press, Washington, DC. .

1959 births
Living people
American people of Italian descent
Musicians from Brooklyn
People from Elmont, New York
Singer-songwriters from New York (state)